Martín Ricardo Echegoyen (3 April 1891 in Montevideo – 18 May 1974 in Montevideo) was a Uruguayan political figure. In the years 1959 to 1960 he was president of Uruguay.

Political background 

Echegoyen was a member of the National Party, which in the 1958 elections ended the longstanding tradition of Colorado Party Presidents.

He served under President Gabriel Terra as Education Minister from 1935 to 1936, and as Public Works Minister from 1936 to 1938. He later ran as the National Party's Vice Presidential candidate in 1946 and 1950.

For many years, he served as a prominent member of the Senate. He was its president from March 1, 1963, to March 1, 1967.

President of Uruguay; later career 

Echegoyen served as President of the National Council of Government of Uruguay 1959–1960. He was succeeded as President by Benito Nardone, a National Party colleague.

After relinquishing the Presidency in 1960, Echegoyen ran for President in 1966 but was beaten by Oscar Diego Gestido.

Subsequently, already aged in his 80s, Echegoyen presided over the Council of State in the civilian-military administration instituted by President Juan María Bordaberry in 1973.

Echegoyen died on 18 May 1974 at the age of 83.

See also 

 Politics of Uruguay

References

 :es:Martín Echegoyen

External links
 

1891 births
1974 deaths
People from Montevideo
Uruguayan people of Basque descent
National Party (Uruguay) politicians
Presidents of the National Council of Government (Uruguay)
Presidents of the Senate of Uruguay
University of the Republic (Uruguay) alumni
20th-century Uruguayan lawyers
National Council of Government (Uruguay)
Candidates for President of Uruguay
Uruguayan vice-presidential candidates